Sahar Aziz is a professor of law and Chancellor’s Social Justice Scholar at Rutgers Law School.

Aziz is part of a long tradition of American law scholars who helped advance civil rights in U.S. courts.
She argued that following the 9/11 attacks, the Muslim community living in the U.S. was deprived of full legal protection and of the full benefit of their civil rights.

Biography
Sahar F. Aziz was born in Cairo, Egypt and raised in the U.S. 
Aziz studied Middle East Studies at the University of Texas. She worked as clerk at the District Court of Maryland for Judge Andre M. Davis. Aziz also worked for private law firms as associate and at the United States Department of Homeland Security before becoming a full time professor.

Denouncing Islamophobia in the Global North
Aziz believes that in the Western world, Muslims as a group are assigned negative traits such as being violent and untrustworthy. Aziz described this attribution of negative traits to Muslims as a process of racialization, which took place in the U.S. after 9/11 terrorist attacks. One manifestation is that immigrants to the U.S. originally from Middle East and North Africa are perceived as forever foreign, according to Aziz.
In the U.S., Aziz pointed out that the presidency of Donald Trump led to a backsliding of the rights of the Muslim community and to discrimination, such as for example bullying of Muslim children at schools.

In Europe, the situation of the Muslim community is worse in comparative terms according to Aziz because fewer people practice religion in Europe compared to the U.S. Therefore pointing to religion as an excuse for unwelcome behaviour is less available to Muslims, because it is less central to the European legal tradition to start with.

Published works

References

Living people
1970s births
Year of birth uncertain
American women lawyers
American women legal scholars
American legal scholars
Rutgers School of Law–Newark faculty